Zakhi, literally meaning smart and strong, (Zakhi-Miana, Zakhi-Kohna or Zakhi Qadeem, Zakhi-Charbagh, and Zahi-Qabristan) in the Nowshera district of the Khyber Pakhtunkhwa Province of Pakistan. The population is around 15,000; the majority of them work in agriculture, a small number are involved in government jobs, and some work outside the country. The villagers are 99% ethnic Pashtun tribes and 1% non-Pashtun, they speak Hindko or Persian languages.

Location
Zakhi's is located near Akbarpura (34° 3' 25" North, 71° 43' 18" East) on Peshawar-Islamabad Motorway in Nowshera District. it is nearly 15 km from Peshawar on Grand Trunk Road 45 km from Nowshera. Across the Kabul River on the north about 25 km, Charsadda city is located.

History
Mostly Afghan Pashtun came to this area around 1557 with Bairam Khan who ruled on behalf of the Mughal Emperor Akbar the Great. The village Akbarpura, the village closest to Zakhi, was named after the great Mughal King Akbar the Great who camped here while travelling between Kabul and Delhi. In around 1834 this was ruled by Maharaja Ranjit Singh.

Due to its geographical location (near the River Kabul), the area and especially the village of Zakhi have a risk of flooding. In the 18th century, flood destroyed the entire village and after the said catastrophe, Zakhi was sub-divided into four new villages namely, Zakhi-Miana, Zakhi-Qabristan, Zakhi-Kona and Zakhi-Charbagh.  All these four village's names come from old Persian language and it is still unclear that what is the real meaning of Zakhi. Probably the name Zakhi is older than Pashtun arrival to this area. Currently 99.9%  Muslim Sunni Pashtun people are living in Zakhi villages.

Akbarpura and the surrounding area was the home to Muslims, Hindus, Sikhs, and Christians, living peacefully until the Partition of India. The people of Zakhi supported Khan Abdul Ghaffar Khan Frontier Gandhi during the struggle for India's independence, and  Gandal Khan baba was appointed the first Jarnails (General) of Khudai Khidmatgar movement from Zakhi Miana in 1930. . In 1947, after the partition of India, the Zakhi area, being part of the Pakistan fell under the auspices of the new Pakistani administration.

Before the Partition, under the British Administration, a boys school, a small road and irrigation system (canals and watercourses) were built in about 1930s, which paved an important landmark for development of agriculture and other infrastructure and assist the people of this area.

Literacy
The literacy rate is 90% for men and 85% for women. This percentage includes people able to write their name only.
 Professionals 10%;
 Technicians 15%;
 Agriculture workers 50%;
 Elementary occupations 3.6%;
 Service and shop workers 2%;
 Armed forces 1%;
 Craft and related trade workers 2%;
 Clerks 2%
 and other 2.4%.

Politics
For unknown reasons, women were not permitted to vote or take part in politics in Zakhi, but now the situation is quite different, as Zakhi now has an M.P.A on the reserved seat of women parliamentarian i.e. Ms Shagufta Malik was selected Parliamentarian for women reserved seat (ANP), she belongs to Zakhi Kohna from ANP. This area used to be the stronghold of Awami National Party. In 2008-2013, Parveez Khan Kattak PK-13 and Eng:Muhammad Tariq Khattak  NA-5 of were elected Parliamentarians. ANP won each time at the polling station of Zakhi, which shows that ideological Pakhtuns are present in much number in Zakhi, but this time PTI won the seat of pK-13 as well as NA-5 and Mr Pervaiz Khattak CM KPK was successful. Nowshera district, and especially PK-13, may become a top priority of the elected CM, as he is the winning candidate from the last three decades on this constituency.

Agriculture
The area, located on the bank of the Kabul River in the north and the Bara River in the east, has fertile lands where vegetables and fruits are produced. Tomatoes are grown in abundance and exported to all parts of the country, especially Karachi. Pears, peaches and Aalu Bukhara are also grown in the area and are exported to remote parts of Pakistan. Among other cash crops are sugarcane and wheat. Haji Umar Khan and his brother Gul Rehman were the leading exporters and transporters of agricultural products to about all parts of subcontinent in the year 1930s to 1980s. After them, Faras Gul and Fazal Rahim are the top businessmen and transporters of fruits from the area of Zakhi to various parts of Pakistan.

2010 Pakistan floods
In 2010 a major flood brought massive damage to infrastructure such as buildings, roads, crops and complete destruction to irrigation systems in the surrounding Zakhi District [Nowashera]. The flood left nearly 20% people homeless. Zakhi was mainly hit by the flood water of river Bara which flows on the eastern side of the area. The flood water started entering the area on the morning of 29 July 2010 and started receding late on 30 July 2010. This was the first time in known history that such a massive flood hit this area. One of the possible reasons for the flood was the weakening of the protective wall due to removal of soil by the locals.

Development

This part of Pakistan and specially of Khyber Pukhtun Khwa is one of the peaceful area in the present days situation (2013). So many mega govt projects were carried on in this area by the Govt of Khyber Pukhtunkhwa. Beside the government, a few international NGOs such as UN organizations, US AID, Japanese AID, NRC, RDP Muslimhands and Islamic Relief through local NGOs had supported poor people and provided them basic life support and facilities after the flood.
Distribution of Watan cards cash support, Benazir income cash support and Zakkat fund cash support are successfully in line stream. However some political interference and pleasure of the party members were also considered. This cash amount ~35% were distributed among the party members on the basis of party affiliations.

References
 https://www.cbc.ca/news/world/pakistan-flood-disaster-worst-he-s-seen-un-chief-1.882542
 http://www.maplandia.com/pakistan/n-w-f-p/peshawar/akbarpura/
 http://www.panwfp.gov.pk/index.php/members/profile/en/19/286
 http://themoderatevoice.com/23121/remembering-mahatma-gandhi-pashtun-gandhi/
 http://www.britannica.com Red Shirt Movement.(2008) Encyclopædia Britannica
 http://nowshera.com/about.htm
 http://www.saudiaramcoworld.com/issue/200401/journeys.of.faith.roads.of.civilization.htm

Populated places in Nowshera District